Lapinlahden Linnut ("Birds of Lapinlahti") was a Finnish band and comedy group, founded in the spring of 1983, which played humorous rock/pop music. The band started as buskers. In the beginning, the band used some original instruments such as a ring binder, and they still use an empty beer crate in their music. Lapinlahden Linnut have made seven TV series, the third being Maailman kahdeksan ihmettä, participating in the Montreaux Rose d'Or festival, under the name "Rampton Birds Show: Eight Wonders of the World". In 2006 the band returned to its old 1990–1991 lineup. The band held its farewell tour in 2013.

Members 
 Timo Eränkö — vocals, saxophone, 1983 -
 Pekka Hedkrok — vocals, keyboard, 1983 -
 Matti Jaaranen — vocals, trumpet, 1983 -
 Tapio Liinoja - vocals, 1983–1994, 2006 -
 Markku Toikka - vocals, 1983–1990, 2006 -
 Mikko Kivinen - vocals, 1983–1992, 2006 -
 Hannu Lemola - drums, 1986–1997, 2006 -
 Veli-Pekka Oinonen - guitar, 1989–1995, 2006 -

Former members 
 Ari "Arvid" Kettunen - keyboard, 1983–1988
 Heikki "Hiski" Salomaa - vocals, 1983 - d. 1.7.2003
 Jan Noponen - drums, 1983–1986
 Ari Wahlsten — vocals, 1994–2006
 Pekka Rechardt - guitar, 1995–2002
 Harri "Hate" Kinnunen — drums, 1997–2005
 Pekka Virtanen — guitar, keyboard, bass, 2002–2005
 Aarni Kivinen — vocals, saxophone, 2003–2006
 Sami Kariluoma — drums, 2005–2006
 Jaku Havukainen — guitar, 2005–2006

Discography

Albums
Lapinlahden Linnut (1985)
Jep (1986)
Vihreä Gorilla (1987)
Lauluja Nuppilasta (1988)
Parhaat (1988)
Elämä Janottaa (1989)
Ei Oikotietä Sankaruuteen 1983–1989 (1989)
Tähdet Kertovat (1990)
Grrr! (1992)
Köyhän Taivas (1994)
Sulkasatoa Osa I (1994)
Sulkasatoa Osa II (1995)
Tyttö Huutaa Hii! (1996)
Kansandances (1997)
Iso Muna (1999)
Höyhenet Pöllyää! (2000)
Kaikkien Aikojen Parhaat (2002)
Kolmas Jalka Haudassa (2003)
Pienvikaisten paratiisi (2005)
Lintuinfluenssa vol 1 & vol 2 (2006)
Etiäppäin (2007)

Singles
 Lipputangon nuppi / Sisäinen ahdistus
 Tapasin naisen / Sateet tulevat
 Tavallinen Jörndonner / Pikkumiesten laulu
 Rakas, ukulele soi / Tenukeppi'''
 Älä pure mun ananasta / Hip hop Elämä janottaa / Tuoli kaatuu Se ei käy / Aino kirjoittaa Vihtaasi on kustu / Ruma Älä viskaa mua pihalle / Sedät jaksaa heilua Otto ja pano / Hellä Ulla Karvaisen kiitoksen metsästäjä / Aimon virsi Se tekee gutaa / Tiiviö Helppoa elämää / Hengessä Kollaan Sä teet mut hulluksi / Kalliossa Vanha suomalaisten poikain vitutuslaulu sekä ko. kappaleen remix ja dub mix
 Siittiöt (Siitosen veljekset) / Työtön, hullu ja eläkeläinen Köyhän taivas / Jos on eläin Köyhän taivas / Viheltävä Ville ja Pekka Petomaani Kaivollinen Kossua / Nyt sitä saa / Perse Enää en sano sanaakaan / Sen pitää olla Raimoa Älä itke, älä sure / Ei liian syvälle XL miehiä sekä XXL ja XXXL -remixit
 Pekka ja Justiina / XL-miehiä Voisinko olla minä / Kaljasta kaljaan Mun puutarhassa sekä Mun puutarhassa -remix
 Kilttejä lapsia Kesäapina Sä oot kaikkea kumista ja muovista Äideistä rumin Kolmas jalka haudassa / Suomi takaisin AIAIAIVOIVOIVOI Tänä kesänä perkele! Vedä mua otsikkoon Vedä lärvit, Matti Vanhanen Naiset vaihtaa mua kuin paitaa / Tyttö dynamiittivyössä Keski-ikä on syvältä (promo)
 Etiäppäin! (promo)
 Mun muriseva koirani Iines (promo)
 Takkatulen ääressä / Runo josta ei tullut mitään (promo)

 TV-series Kyllä elämä on ihanaaSeitsemän kuolemansyntiä (1988)Maailman kahdeksan ihmettä (1990)Kuudesti laukeava (1992)Lapinlahden Linnut -show (1993)Lapinlahden Linnut! (1995)Muuttuuko ihminen? (2006)

 Radio show Tieteellinen testiryhmä Music videos Lipputangon nuppiPikkumiesten lauluElämässä täytyy kosiaHeti mulle kaikki tänne nytÄlä viskaa mua pihalleÄlä pure mun ananastaKalliossaKesäapinaJos on eläinKöyhän taivasPekka ja JustiinaKaikkea kumista ja muovista (2000)Hiljaisten miesten baari (2003)Vedä lärvit Matti Vanhanen (2005)Keski-ikä on syvältä'' (2006)

References

External links 
  official homepage

Finnish musical groups
Finnish comedy musicians